Thynnichthys vaillanti is a species of cyprinid of the genus Thynnichthys. It inhabits rivers in eastern Borneo.

References

Cyprinid fish of Asia
Fish described in 1916